The Baffin ice sheet was the most northerly portion of the Laurentide Ice Sheet, centered in the Foxe Basin between Baffin Island and the Melville Peninsula north of Hudson Bay.  Blocked from a southward flow by the Keewatin and Labrador Ice sheets, it moved north and eastward across Baffin Island into the Baffin Sound.  Two smaller ice domes formed along the island chain of the Sound as the Barnes Dome, Penny Dome and the Amadjuak Dome.

See also
Laurentide Ice Sheet
Cordilleran ice sheet
Keewatin ice sheet
Labrador ice sheet
Baffin ice sheet

References

Bibliography
Fulton, R. J. & Prest, V. K. (1987). Introduction: The Laurentide Ice Sheet and its Significance. Géographie physique et Quaternaire, 41 (2), 181–186.

Glaciology of Canada
Glaciology of the United States
Ice ages
Ice sheets
Geology of Nunavut
Geology of Newfoundland and Labrador